PK-115 Dera Ismail Khan-V (کلاچی) now changed to PK-99 (Dera Ismail Khan-V) is a constituency for the Khyber Pakhtunkhwa Assembly of the Khyber Pakhtunkhwa province of Pakistan.It comprises Kulachi Tehsil, Draban Tehsil and FR Region Dera Ismail Khan.

See also
 PK-114 Dera Ismail Khan-IV
 PK-1 Upper Chitral

References

External links 
 Khyber Pakhtunkhwa Assembly's official website
 Election Commission of Pakistan's official website
 Awaztoday.com Search Result
 Election Commission Pakistan Search Result

Khyber Pakhtunkhwa Assembly constituencies